The Hesse family is a Ghanaian family of Dano-German origins. The progenitor of the family was Dr. Lebrecht Wilhelm Hesse, a German medical doctor and a subject of the Danish Crown under King Christian VII. Hesse was an employee of the Danish colonial administration. After qualifying in medicine and surgery, he sailed to the Gold Coast as a young bachelor in the late 1700s to treat chaplains from the Church of Denmark and its latter affiliate, the Danish Missionary Society, civil servants and garrison soldiers stationed at the Christiansborg Castle, now called the Osu Castle. He married a local Ga woman, Lamiorkai, from Osu Amantra in Accra.

During the nineteenth century, the Euro-Ga descendants of Dr. L. W. Hesse were influential in commerce in the Gold Coast colony. Family members later branched into other occupations, becoming bureaucrats and ministers. Additionally, the Hesse family is directly related to the Clerk family through Dr. Hesse's granddaughter, Pauline Hesse (1831–1909), a trader who was married to Alexander Worthy Clerk (1820–1906), a Jamaican Moravian teacher. Clerk was among 24 individuals from the West Indies recruited by the Basel Mission of Switzerland in 1843 and sent to Ghana to establish Protestant churches and schools.

Notable members 
 Herman Chinery-Hesse (born 1963), technology entrepreneur and founder of theSOFTribe
L. J. Chinery-Hesse (1930–2018), parliamentary draftsman, Solicitor-General and Acting Attorney General (1979)
Mary Chinery-Hesse (born 1938), international civil servant and diplomat, first woman Chancellor of the University of Ghana, Legon  
 Adukwei Hesse, physician-academic, tuberculosis control expert, prison reform advocate and Presbyterian minister
Afua Adwo Jectey Hesse, First Ghanaian woman to train as a paediatric surgeon
Chris Tsui Hesse (born 1932), cinematographer, filmmaker, prison reform campaigner and Presbyterian minister
L. W. Fifi Hesse (1934–2000), First black African Rhodes Scholar, Director-General, Ghana Broadcasting Corporation (GBC), 1972–1974; 1984–1988 and Member, Public Services Commission of Ghana
 Regina Hesse (1832–1898), pioneer woman educator-administrator in colonial Ghana
Virginia Hesse (born 1944), civil servant and commercial officer at the Ministry of Trade and Industry, Ambassador of Ghana to the Czech Republic (2017–2021)

See also 

 Gold Coast Euro-Africans

References 

Christian families
Christian ministry families
Ga-Adangbe families
Ga-Adangbe families of Danish descent
Ga-Adangbe families of German descent
Ghanaian families

Medical families
Presbyterian families
Priestly families